Ermineskin is a residential neighbourhood in south west Edmonton, Alberta, Canada. The neighbourhood is named for Chief Ermineskin of Maskwacis.

The neighbourhood is bounded on the west by 111 Street, on the south by 23 Avenue, and on the east by Calgary Trail and Gateway Boulevard. The north boundary is a utility corridor located just to the north of 29 Avenue.

The community is represented by the Ermineskin Community League, established in 1978, which maintains a community hall and outdoor rink located at 107 Street and 32A Avenue.

Demographics 

Residential development 
While some residential development in Ermineskin dates to the 1960s and earlier, according to the 2001 federal census the bulk or residential development in the neighbourhood occurred during the 1970s and 1980s. Approximately two out of every five (42.6%) were built during the 1970s.  Another one in three (30.5%) were built during the 1980s. One in five (19.7%) were built during the 1990s.

According to the 2005 municipal census, the most common type of residences in the neighbourhood are rented apartments and apartment style condominiums. These account for approximately two out of every three (66%) residences in the neighbourhood. Approximately half of all apartment style residences are in low-rise buildings with fewer than five stories while the other half are in high-rise buildings with five or more stories.  One residence in six (16%)are single-family dwellings and one residence in eight (13%) are row houses.  One in twenty (5%) are duplexes  Almost three out of every four (72%) residences in the neighbourhood are rented, while just over on in four (28%) are owner-occupied.

Century Park

Century Park is a transit-oriented development.  It replaces the now vacant Heritage Mall site, and will eventually be home to almost 5,000 residents, hundreds of thousands of square feet of office and retail space, parks, and a small lake.  The development is served by the Century Park LRT Station as part of the South LRT Expansion, completed in April 2010.

The total cost of the project when completed in 2014 is estimated to be one billion dollars.

Almost 100 people lined up overnight outside the development's marketing centre when the first condos went on sale in September 2006, at a starting price of $393,000. All 131 units available for sale were sold out within six hours.

Population mobility 
The population in Ermineskin is highly mobile.  According to the 2005 municipal census, one resident in four (24.5%) had moved within the previous twelve months.  Another one in four (28.3%) had moved within the previous one to three years.  Only one resident in three (33.1%) had lived at the same address for five years or longer.

Schools 
There are no schools in Ermineskin.  Schooling for children in Ermineskin is provided at schools in surrounding neighbourhoods:
 Edmonton Public School System
 Keheewin Elementary School in Keheewin
 Steinhauer Elementary School in Steinhauer
 Sweet Grass Public School in Sweet Grass
 Edmonton Catholic School System
 St. Sophia Catholic School in Sweet Grass
 St. Teresa Catholic Elementary School in Blue Quill
 St. Augustine Catholic Elementary School in Duggan

Surrounding neighbourhoods

See also 
 Edmonton Federation of Community Leagues

References

External links 
 Ermineskin Neighbourhood Profile

Neighbourhoods in Edmonton